Pentyl nitrite is a chemical compound with the molecular formula, classified as an alkyl nitrite, used as an antihypertensive medicine. It is also used to treat cyanide poisoning.

It is one of the chemicals used recreationally as poppers.

References

alkyl nitrites
Inhalants